Dog Squad is a reality TV show following working dogs and handlers as they go about their daily duties. It is set in New Zealand and focuses on dog-handler pairs working for the New Zealand Police, Department of Corrections (New Zealand), New Zealand Customs Service, Ministry of Agriculture and Forestry (New Zealand), Civil Aviation Authority of New Zealand, Department of Conservation (New Zealand), and Search and rescue.

Dog Squad currently airs between 8:00-8:30pm on Mondays on TV One. It was created by the same people who created Border Patrol. The first episode of Dog Squad aired on 25 July 2011. The show also screens in Australia on Channel 7, under the title Dog Patrol.

References
 
 

New Zealand reality television series
TVNZ 1 original programming
Television shows about dogs
Television series by Greenstone TV